Matarau is a locality in Northland, New Zealand. Kamo is to the southeast. The area is changing from farmland to lifestyle blocks.

The name "Matarau" means many points or many spears.

Demographics

Matarau statistical area had a population of 2,979 at the 2018 New Zealand census, an increase of 426 people (16.7%) since the 2013 census, and an increase of 702 people (30.8%) since the 2006 census. There were 999 households, comprising 1,545 males and 1,434 females, giving a sex ratio of 1.08 males per female. The median age was 42.0 years (compared with 37.4 years nationally), with 663 people (22.3%) aged under 15 years, 435 (14.6%) aged 15 to 29, 1,434 (48.1%) aged 30 to 64, and 444 (14.9%) aged 65 or older.

Ethnicities were 90.7% European/Pākehā, 15.8% Māori, 1.8% Pacific peoples, 2.6% Asian, and 2.5% other ethnicities. People may identify with more than one ethnicity.

The percentage of people born overseas was 14.7, compared with 27.1% nationally.

Although some people chose not to answer the census's question about religious affiliation, 55.5% had no religion, 35.2% were Christian, 0.4% were Hindu, 0.1% were Muslim, 0.7% were Buddhist and 1.6% had other religions.

Of those at least 15 years old, 450 (19.4%) people had a bachelor's or higher degree, and 342 (14.8%) people had no formal qualifications. The median income was $37,300, compared with $31,800 nationally. 510 people (22.0%) earned over $70,000 compared to 17.2% nationally. The employment status of those at least 15 was that 1,209 (52.2%) people were employed full-time, 405 (17.5%) were part-time, and 60 (2.6%) were unemployed.

Education
Matarau School is a coeducational full primary school (years 1-8) with a roll of  students as of  The school was founded in 1877 as Ruatangata East School. Otakairanga School amalgamated with Matarau School in 1949, and Ruatangata West School also closed in favour of Matarau in 1973.

Notes

External links
 Matarau School website

Populated places in the Northland Region
Whangarei District